The 2017 Hardee's Pro Classic was a professional tennis tournament played on outdoor clay courts. It was the seventeenth edition of the tournament and part of the 2017 ITF Women's Circuit, offering a total of $60,000 in prize money. It took place in Dothan, United States, from 17–23 April 2017.

Singles main draw entrants

Seeds 

 1 Rankings as of 10 April 2017

Other entrants 
The following players received wildcards into the singles main draw:
  Usue Maitane Arconada
  Sophie Chang
  Elizabeth Halbauer
  Caitlin Whoriskey

The following players received entry into the singles main draw by a protected ranking:
  Anhelina Kalinina
  Samantha Murray

The following players received entry into the singles main draw by a junior exempt:
  Amanda Anisimova

The following players received entry from the qualifying draw:
  Jaqueline Cristian
  Ashley Kratzer
  Tena Lukas
  Sanaz Marand

The following player received entry into the singles main draw by a lucky loser:
  Nicole Coopersmith

Champions

Singles

 Kristie Ahn def.  Amanda Anisimova, 1–6, 6–2, 6–2

Doubles

 Emina Bektas /  Sanaz Marand def.  Kristie Ahn /  Lizette Cabrera, 6–3, 1–6, [10–2]

External links 
 2017 Hardee's Pro Classic at ITFtennis.com
 Official website 

2017 in American tennis
2017 ITF Women's Circuit
2017